Theni was a state assembly constituency in Theni district in Tamil Nadu. The constituency was in existence since 1957 election till 2011.

Madras State

Tamil Nadu

Election results

1957

References

External links
 

Former assembly constituencies of Tamil Nadu
Theni district